Background Music is the debut studio album by the American hardcore punk band Give Up the Ghost. The album was originally released on June 12, 2001 through Equal Vision Records under the name American Nightmare, but was later reissued in 2003 under the name Give Up the Ghost after another band named American Nightmare filed a cease and desist order. Background Music was also reissued in 2011 through Deathwish Inc. in celebration of the band's reunion shows.

Track listing
 "(We Are)" – 2:38
 "There's a Black Hole in the Shadow of the Pru" – 2:00
 "AM/PM" – 3:05
 "Shoplifting in a Ghost Town" – 2:51
 "I Saved Latin" – 0:22
 "Postmark My Compass" – 2:15
 "I.C. You Are Feeling Drake" – 2:09
 "Hearts" – 1:03
 "God Save the Queen" – 2:00
 "Your Arsonist" – 2:48
 "Farewell" – 2:22

References

Equal Vision Records albums
Deathwish Inc. albums
2001 albums